Ayaka Miyao is a retired Japanese professional boxer. She is a two-time atomweight world champion, having held the IBF female title since February 2022 and the WBA female title from 2012 to 2015.

Professional boxing record

References

Living people
Japanese women boxers
Atomweight boxers
Mini-flyweight boxers
Light-flyweight boxers
Sportspeople from Nagano Prefecture
World Boxing Association champions
International Boxing Federation champions
1983 births